Wave Loch Inc. is a surf ride manufacturing company responsible for such water rides as the FlowBarrel, Flying Reef, SurfPool, Wave House franchises, and, formerly, FlowRider.

History
During the 1980s, Tom Lochtefeld was a partner in the development of Raging Waters water parks in the United States. He created a water park attraction to simulate the riding of waves in the ocean. In 1988, a patent was taken out for "a wave-forming generator for generating inclined surfaces on a contained body of water". This was the concept of a sheet wave, the basis of most of Wave Loch's rides. Lochtefeld worked with Charles Sauerbier, Carl Ekstrom and others to model the wave using wave tanks at the Scripps Institution of Oceanography in La Jolla.

The first WaveLoch FlowRider opened at the Schlitterbahn in Texas in 1991. This was followed by the first FlowBarrel at the Summerland Resort in Norway two years later.

In 1999, Wave Loch built a portable FlowBarrel which was shipped around the
world to support the SWATCH and Siemens Wave Tours, which visited Florence,
Munich, Australia and other places. Wave House South Africa opened in 2001 with a double FlowBarrel called the D Rex, and two FlowRider Singles at the center of an entertainment, retail and food and beverage complex.

In 2005, Wave House San Diego opened at the northwest corner of the Belmont Park amusement area in San Diego, where the company headquarters was located for ten years. By 2009, Wave Loch had sold more than 175 FlowRider sheet waves to locations around the world. In 2014, there were Wave Houses located in Durban, San Diego, Santiago, Chile, Sentosa, Singapore, and Mallorca. Additional locations are planned for Miami, Orange County, and three in China.

In 2014, Wave Loch sold the FlowRider IP and technology to WhiteWater West, although it retained the Flow Barrel and Wave House brands.  As of 2018, there are over 230 FlowRiders installed around the world.

That same year, after ten years of R&D, Wave Loch introduced its Surf Pool technology. With its goal of making surfing an Olympic sport, Wave Loch’s Surf Pool generates  waves every ten seconds in a  footprint. Like waves in the real ocean, all of Wave Loch’s SurfPools are powered by changes in air pressure.

References

External links
 "Making Waves", Wired Magazine, August 1999
 "Making Hay of Haymakers", Forbes, 2005
 "Making Waves", San Diego Tribune, 2006
 "Royal Caribbean allows tricks on surf machine", USA Today, 2013
 "Makin' Waves", Durango Herald, 2013
"Surf Park Insider Series: Tom Lochtefeld", Surf Park Central, 2015

1981 establishments in the United States
Companies established in 1981
Companies based in San Diego